Grant Schofield is a former football (soccer) goalkeeper who represented New Zealand at international level.

Schofield played two official A-international matches for the New Zealand, making his debut in a 0–2 loss to England on 18 June 1991. His second official appearance didn't come until some five years later in a 2–3 loss to Qatar on 5 October 1996.

References 

Year of birth missing (living people)
Living people
Manurewa AFC players
New Zealand association footballers
New Zealand international footballers
Association football goalkeepers